Giacomo Boni may refer to:

Giacomo Boni (archaeologist) (1859–1925), Italian archeologist specialised in Roman architecture
Giacomo Boni (painter) (1688–1766), Italian Baroque painter